Season twenty-three of Dancing with the Stars premiered on September 12, 2016, on the ABC network.

On November 22, 2016, Olympic gymnast Laurie Hernandez and Valentin Chmerkovskiy were announced the winners, while IndyCar driver James Hinchcliffe and Sharna Burgess finished in second place, and Detroit Lions wide receiver Calvin Johnson Jr. and Lindsay Arnold finished third.

Cast

Couples
The first eight professional dancers were revealed on Good Morning America on August 23, 2016: Lindsay Arnold, Sharna Burgess, Witney Carson, Artem Chigvintsev, Val Chmerkovskiy, Sasha Farber, Allison Holker, and Gleb Savchenko. Later, other returning dancers were announced: Emma Slater, Maksim Chmerkovskiy, Derek Hough, and Cheryl Burke. Jenna Johnson was the only new pro this season, having previously been a member of the troupe. Keo Motsepe returned, but as a member of the show's dance troupe.

The full cast of celebrities and pros was revealed on August 30, 2016, on Good Morning America.

Hosts and judges
Tom Bergeron and Erin Andrews returned as hosts, and Carrie Ann Inaba, Len Goodman, and Bruno Tonioli returned as judges. On August 26, 2016, it was reported that Julianne Hough would return to the show as a judge following a hiatus. Due to a personal tragedy, Erin Andrews took a week off from her co-hosting duties and former pro Kym Johnson-Herjavec filled in during the results show in week 3. On October 17, Pitbull took over Len Goodman's position as a guest judge for week 6. On November 7, Idina Menzel took over for Goodman as a guest judge for week 9.

Dance troupe 
Season 23 troupe consisted of returning members Brittany Cherry, Hayley Erbert, Alan Bersten and Dennis Jauch, joined by former pro Keo Motsepe and added new member Britt Stewart.

Scoring charts

Notes

 : The couples were scored on a 30-point scale due to the absence of Len Goodman.
 : This was the lowest score of the week.
 : This was the highest score of the week.
 :  This couple finished in first place.
 :  This couple finished in second place.
 :  This couple finished in third place.
 :  This couple was eliminated.

Highest and lowest scoring performances
The best and worst performances in each dance according to the judges' 40-point scale are as follows:

Couples' highest and lowest scoring dances
Scores are based upon a potential 40-point maximum.

Weekly scores
Individual judges' scores in the charts below (given in parentheses) are listed in this order from left to right: Carrie Ann Inaba, Len Goodman, Julianne Hough, Bruno Tonioli.

Week 1: First Dances
The couples danced the cha-cha-cha, foxtrot, jive, or Viennese waltz. Couples are listed in the order they performed. After Ryan & Cheryl's performance, two protesters were arrested for rushing to the stage and shouting at Lochte.

Week 2: TV Night
The couples performed one unlearned dance to famous TV theme songs. The Argentine tango, paso doble, quickstep, and tango were introduced. Couples are listed in the order they performed.

Week 3: Face-off Night
The couples were paired off into six sets, and each set of couples performed the same dance to different songs. The highest-scoring couple from each set won immunity and could not be eliminated. Any ties were broken by Len Goodman. The salsa was introduced. Couples are listed in the order they performed.

Week 4: Cirque du Soleil Night
Individual judges' scores in this chart (given in parentheses) are listed in this order from left to right: Carrie Ann Inaba, Julianne Hough, Bruno Tonioli.

The couples performed one unlearned dance inspired by a Cirque du Soleil show, while Cirque du Soleil acrobats, aerialists, dancers, and fire-stick performers performed alongside them. The Charleston, jazz, and samba were introduced. Two couples were eliminated at the end of the night. Couples are listed in the order they performed.

Week 5: Most Memorable Year Night
Individual judges' scores in the chart below (given in parentheses) are listed in this order from left to right: Carrie Ann Inaba, Julianne Hough, Bruno Tonioli.

The couples performed one unlearned dance to celebrate the most memorable year of their lives. Contemporary was introduced. No elimination took place this week. Couples are listed in the order they performed.

Week 6: Latin Night
Individual judges' scores in the chart below (given in parentheses) are listed in this order from left to right: Carrie Ann Inaba, Pitbull, Julianne Hough, Bruno Tonioli.

The couples danced a Latin-inspired routine. The rumba was introduced. Couples are listed in the order they performed.

Week 7: Eras Night
The couples performed one unlearned dance and a team dance representing different historical eras. The jitterbug was introduced. Couples are listed in the order they performed.

After a three-week absence, Len Goodman temporarily returned to the judges' table.

Week 8: Halloween Night
Individual judges' scores in the chart below (given in parentheses) are listed in this order from left to right: Carrie Ann Inaba, Julianne Hough, Bruno Tonioli.

Couples performed one unlearned dance. The couple with the highest score earned immunity from elimination, while the rest of the couples participated in dance-offs for extra points. Because Calvin, Laurie, and James all earned perfect scores, the tiebreaker was cumulative points over the season, which resulted in James winning immunity and a five-point bonus. For each dance-off, the couple with the highest score picked the opponent against whom they wanted to dance; the chosen opponent was allowed to pick the dance style (cha-cha-cha, jive, or salsa). The winner of each dance-off earned three bonus points. Couples are listed in the order they performed.

James Hinchcliffe performed with Jenna Johnson after Sharna Burgess sustained an injury the week before.

Week 9: Showstoppers Night
Individual judges' scores in the chart below (given in parentheses) are listed in this order from left to right: Carrie Ann Inaba, Idina Menzel, Julianne Hough, Bruno Tonioli.

Couples performed one musical theatre-inspired dance and a team-up dance with another couple, which involved the celebrities dancing side-by-side to the same song and receiving the same set of scores from the judges for the routine. The waltz was introduced. Couples are listed in the order they performed.

Jenna Johnson performed again with James Hinchcliffe this week.

Week 10: Semifinals
Individual judges' scores in the chart below (given in parentheses) are listed in this order from left to right: Carrie Ann Inaba, Julianne Hough, Bruno Tonioli.

The couples performed an unlearned dance and a trio dance involving an eliminated pro or a member of the troupe.

Week 11: Finals
Individual judges' scores in the chart below (given in parentheses) are listed in this order from left to right: Carrie Ann Inaba, Len Goodman, Julianne Hough, Bruno Tonioli.

On the first night, the couples performed a redemption dance and a freestyle. On the second night, the final three couples performed a fusion dance that combined two dance styles. Couples are listed in the order they performed.

After a three-week absence, Len Goodman returned to the judges' table for the finals.

Night 1

Night 2

Dance chart
The celebrities and professional partners danced one of these routines for each corresponding week:
 Week 1 (First Dances): One unlearned dance
 Week 2 (TV Night): One unlearned dance
 Week 3 (Face-off Night): One unlearned dance
 Week 4 (Cirque du Soleil Night): One unlearned dance
 Week 5 (Most Memorable Year Night): One unlearned dance
 Week 6 (Latin Night): One unlearned Latin dance
 Week 7 (Eras Night): One unlearned dance & team dances
 Week 8 (Halloween Night): One unlearned dance & dance-offs
 Week 9 (Showstoppers Night): One unlearned dance & team-up challenge
 Week 10 (Semifinals): One unlearned dance & trio dance
 Week 11 (Finals, Night 1): Redemption dance & freestyle
 Week 11 (Finals, Night 2): Fusion dance

Notes

 :  This was the highest scoring dance of the week.
 :  This was the lowest scoring dance of the week.
 :  This couple gained bonus points for winning this dance-off.
 :  This couple gained no bonus points for losing this dance-off.
 :  This couple earned immunity and did not have to compete in the dance-off.
 :  This couple danced, but received no scores.

Ratings

Notes

References

External links

Dancing with the Stars (American TV series)
2016 American television seasons